David Straiton is a Canadian television director.

Career
His directorial debut was a special of the Nickelodeon series Weinerville. Some of his other television credits include: The Secret World of Alex Mack, Dark Angel, Fastlane, The Immortal, Jake 2.0, Heroes, Dollhouse, Star Trek: Enterprise, Standoff, Life, Charmed, Sex, Love & Secrets, House M.D., Mercy, Detroit 1-8-7, Angel, Las Vegas, Defying Gravity, Chaos, The Cape, White Collar, Nikita, The Firm, The Finder, Fringe, Bates Motel, Marvel's Agents of S.H.I.E.L.D., Magnum P.I., MacGyver, Stargirl and The Good Doctor.

References

External links
 

American television directors
Living people
Place of birth missing (living people)
Year of birth missing (living people)